Anna Johansson is a Swedish international ice hockey player.

References

Swedish women's ice hockey players
Year of birth missing (living people)
Living people
Place of birth missing (living people)
Ice hockey players at the 2012 Winter Youth Olympics
Youth Olympic gold medalists for Sweden